Nina Yakovlevna Shaternikova (29 May 1902, Moscow – 27 November 1982, Moscow) was a Soviet stage and film actress.

Life
Her first film role was in the 1919 In the Days of Struggle. She graduated from the Gerasimov Institute of Cinematography in 1923 and then from the "Lenfilm" actors' studio under Boris Sohn in 1936. She performed in the Leningrad Comedy Theatre from 1937 to 1941 and the National Film Actors' Theatre company from 1945. She died in 1982 and is buried in Moscow at the Vvedenskoye Cemetery.

Selected filmography
In the Days of Struggle (1919)
The Iron Heel (1919)
Comedienne (1923)
Lace (1928)
Lieutenant Kijé (1934)
Young Pushkin  (1937)

External links
http://www.imdb.com/name/nm0789402/

Soviet film actresses
Soviet silent film actresses
Soviet stage actresses
Actresses from Moscow
1902 births
1982 deaths